Almasilate is an antacid. It is available in Japan as a mixture with calcium carbonate, and sodium bicarbonate as a non-prescription medication. It is also sold in Taiwan, Germany, and Spain.

References

Antacids
Magnesium compounds
Aluminium compounds
Silicates